Danny Griffin (born July 14, 1998) is an American soccer player who plays as an attacking midfielder for Huntsville City in MLS Next Pro.

Career

Youth
Griffin played with and captained Oakwood Soccer Club during their 2015–16 season.

College
Griffin played four years of college soccer at Providence College between 2016 and 2019, where he scored 13 goals and tallied 6 assists in 80 appearances for the Friars. Griffin was named to the USC Division I All-Great Lakes Region Third Team and the Big East All-Freshman Team in 2016 and All-BIG EAST Third Team in 2019.

Professional
On January 9, 2020, Griffin was selected 49th overall in the 2020 MLS SuperDraft by Columbus Crew SC. However, he was not signed by the team.

Griffin signed his first professional deal with USL Championship club Pittsburgh Riverhounds on March 3, 2020. He made his professional debut on July 12, 2020, appearing as a 67th-minute substitute during a 3–1 win over Louisville City FC. Griffin scored his first professional goal on July 19, 2020 during a 6–0 win over Philadelphia Union II.

Career statistics

References

External links
 
 

1998 births
Living people
American soccer players
Association football midfielders
Columbus Crew draft picks
People from Wethersfield, Connecticut
Providence Friars men's soccer players
Pittsburgh Riverhounds SC players
Soccer players from Connecticut
Sportspeople from Hartford County, Connecticut
USL Championship players
MLS Next Pro players
United States men's youth international soccer players